Tapinodoxa is a genus of moths belonging to the family Tortricidae.

Species
Tapinodoxa autonephes Meyrick, 1931

See also
List of Tortricidae genera

References

 , 1931: Exotic Microlepidoptera. Exotic Microlepidoptera 4 (5): 129–160.

External links
tortricidae.com

Euliini
Tortricidae genera